The  is a railway company in Ibaraki Prefecture, Japan. The third sector company is abbreviated as KRT. It was founded in 1969 to transport freight to and from the coastal industrial area of Kashima.

Lines
Kashima Rinkō Line (freight only):  — Okunoyahama
Ōarai Kashima Line:  — Kashima Soccer Stadium

History
The company was founded on 1 April 1969.

On 12 November 1970, the company opened the freight-only line between Kita-Kashima (present-day Kashima Soccer Stadium) and Okunoyahama. On 14 March 1985, the company opened the passenger line from Mito to Kashima Soccer Stadium.

See also
List of railway companies in Japan

References

External links

  

 
Kashima Antlers
Railway companies of Japan
Companies based in Ibaraki Prefecture
1969 establishments in Japan
Japanese third-sector railway lines